Sheff may refer to:

People:
David Sheff, American author of books
Don Sheff (born 1931), American former competition swimmer
Robert Nathan Sheff (born 1945), avant-garde composer and pianist
Stanley Sheff, Hollywood-born director and writer
Will Sheff (born 1976), the frontman for the Austin, Texas-based indie band Okkervil River

Other:
Sheff, Indiana, an extinct town
Sheffield, a city in England, sometimes called 'Sheff' 
Sheff v. O'Neill, a 1989 lawsuit and the subsequent 1996 Connecticut Supreme Court case
Gluskin Sheff (TSX: GS), a Canadian independent wealth management firm

See also
Sheff. Star or Sheffield Star, a daily newspaper published in Sheffield, England
Sheff U or Sheffield United F.C., professional football club in Sheffield, South Yorkshire, England
Sheff Wed or Sheffield Wednesday F.C., football club in Sheffield, South Yorkshire, England
Scheff